Ian Stafford is a multiple award-winning English sports journalist, author and broadcaster, whose work appears both in the UK and internationally, especially in the United States and Australia. He is also a sought after after dinner speaker, interviewer of stars and compere, acts as a consultant for a number of media outlets and owed and edited the UK's first general sports magazine on the internet, sportsvibe before selling it.
In 2017 he launched the Sporting Club – a private networking club for sport, the business of sport and those who like sport, with permanent homes, many high-level functions and proactive networking – which now has three venues in London and two more in Manchester, with more growth expected shortly.

Career

Journalism
As a journalist Ian has worked for The Times, Daily and Sunday Express, The Independent and The Scotsman and The Mail on Sunday, where he was Chief Sports Reporter, covering every major sporting event over the past 25 years.  He has been voted Sports Reporter of the Year, twice Magazine Sports Writer of the Year, twice highly commended as Sports Interviewer of the Year and twice highly commended as Magazine Sports Writer of the Year and, in 2009, was highly commended as Sports Writer of the Year in the BPA Awards.

Author
He is also an author of participatory books, including Playgrounds of the Gods (Mainstream, 1999), in which he played squash against Jansher Khan, boxed against Roy Jones Jr., was a substitute for the Springboks rugby team against Ireland, was 12th man for Australia in a one-day cricket international against New Zealand, ran in the Kenyan 3000 metres steeplechase national trials, and partnered rower Steve Redgrave at the Henley Royal Regatta. Playgrounds of the Gods was short-listed for the William Hill Sports Book of the Year. His second participatory book, In Your Dreams (Headline, 2001), saw him play football for Everton against Manchester City, sprint in the Norwich Union indoor athletics championships, be "Bomber" Pat Roach's tag wrestling partner, play rugby union for the Leicester Tigers against ULster, rugby league for Wigan against St Helens, cricket for Yorkshire and race for the Jaguar F1 team. In In Search of the Tiger (Ebury Press, 2003) he plays golf with Ernie Els, Bernhard Langer, Nick Faldo, Justin Rose and Jack Nicklaus before meeting Tiger Woods and in Who Do You Think You Are ... Michael Schumacher? (Ebury Press, 2006) he races with or against the likes of Juan Pablo Montoya, Jenson Button, David Coulthard and many others before a final, head to head with Michael Schumacher at the Race of Champions.

In total he has written 17 published books. Others are The Winning Mind (Aurum Press, 1996), a sports psychology book with Steve Backley; Born To be King (Weidenfeld & Nicolson, 1996), biography of Prince Naseem Hamed; Toughing it Out (Orion, 1997), autobiography of explorer David Hempleman-Adams; Grand Slam Champions (Orion, 2003), story of England rugby's Grand Slam; World Cup 2003 (Orion, 2003), official account of England's world cup triumph; Ashes Fever (Mainstream 2005), account of England's Ashes victory; Easy Ryder (Mainstream, 2007), account of Europe's Ryder Cup triumph; New Kid on the Grid (Mainstream, 2008), account of Lewis Hamilton's first season; World Cup 2007 (Orion, 2007), official account of England's world cup campaign; Formula One Opus (Opus Publishing, 2010), official F1 Opus; Mad Dog and Englishman (Hodder & Stoughton, 2011), autobiography of Lewis Moody and the Maradona and Usain Bolt Opuses.

Magazine content writer
Ian's participatory adventures also saw him write The Player series of stories in Esquire magazine where, among other features, he performed stand up comedy mentored by Ed Byrne at the Best of the Fest show at the Edinburgh Festival, appeared as a Shaolin Monk at the Liverpool Empire, a disc jockey on Virgin Radio, a sous chef alongside Gordon Ramsey at Ramsey's flagship Chelsea restaurant, a clown and fire eater at Gerry Cottle's Circus, trekked at the North Pole with explorer/adventurer David Hempleman-Adams, ran with the 2004 Athens Olympics torch in Greece, took on Jonah Lomu in a one-on-one tackle session; ran five times with the bulls at the San Fermin Festival in Pamplona; completed the Cresta Run 10 times; winning the Isle of Wight Yacht Race with Ellen Macarthur.

Broadcaster
As a broadcaster Ian has appeared regularly on British and occasionally international TV and radio networks. His credits include Grandstand, Sportsnight, Sport on Friday, Newsround and Going Live, all on the BBC as a sports reporter; "GMTV" (sports reporter; Quizbowl (Channel 4), captained Mail on Sunday to series win; wrote and narrated two BBC Radio 4 documentaries: Dr Feelgood (on German sports doctor Hans Muller-Wohlfart) and The Khans of Peshawar (on the Khan squash dynasty); plus numerous appearances on BBC Radio 4's Today programme, BBC Radio 5 Live, Channel 4 News, Channel 4's Big Breakfast, Channel 5 News, CNN World Sports, Sky News, Sky Sports, BT Sport. International appearances include WGBH Boston, Channels 7 & 9 in Australia, Supersport in South Africa.

In 2016, he conducted a series of one-hour interviews for Talksport's Talking 2 series with the likes of Sir Steve Redgrave, Sir Dave Brailsford, Eddie Jones, Michael Johnson, Tim Henman and David Coulthard. From January 2018, Ian presents a weekly show on Talksport 2 called Press Pass. It broadcasts on Sunday mornings.

Business activities
Stafford is also the co-founder, co-owner and Managing Editor of Sportsvibe.co.uk, a sports online magazine with news, features, competitions and videos based in London. This was sold in 2017.

In the summer of 2014, as joint CEO, he launched "MC & Hammer" together with music industry veteran Nick Stewart which has become Britain's only all-female sports speaking agency. See www.mcandhammer.co.uk. He is also a regular speaker, compere, auctioneer and Q&A chair on the sport circuit.

In December, 2014 Ian, as Editor in Chief, also helped launch www.kicca.com, a new sports social media and content platform with (to date) 400 top sports stars on board.

In April 2017 Ian launched the Sporting Club in London's Mayfair. To date the club has four venues in London (Mayfair, Soho, Victoria and the City) and five more in Manchester,Leeds, Liverpool, Birmingham and Durham, has staged numerous lunches and dinners (Eddie Jones, David Coulthar, Michael Johnson, Sugar Ray Leonard, Sir Clive Woodward, Lord Seb Coe, Thomas Bjorn, Sugar Ray Leonard, Frankie Dettori, Freddie Flintoff to name but a few), breakfasts, book signings and evening panel events, and has many hundreds of members, all enjoying the private networking club with permanent homes for those who have played sport at a high level, those who love their sport and those in the business of sport.

References

External links
 Sportsvibe
 The Sporting Club

Living people
English sportswriters
English broadcasters
English rugby union commentators
Year of birth missing (living people)